Rheeza Grant (born ) is a Trinidad and Tobago volleyball player. She was part of the Trinidad and Tobago women's national volleyball team.

She participated at the 2011 Women's Pan-American Volleyball Cup.

References

External links
 

1986 births
Living people
Trinidad and Tobago women's volleyball players
Place of birth missing (living people)
Beach volleyball players at the 2018 Commonwealth Games
Beach volleyball players at the 2019 Pan American Games
Commonwealth Games competitors for Trinidad and Tobago
Pan American Games competitors for Trinidad and Tobago